Jackie Williams (1 August 1929 – 1973) was an English footballer, who played as a winger in the Football League for Tranmere Rovers. He died in 1973.

References

Tranmere Rovers F.C. players
Association football wingers
1929 births
1973 deaths
English Football League players
English footballers
Footballers from Liverpool